Margit Pályi (21 October 1908 – 15 April 1996) was a Hungarian gymnast. She competed in the women's artistic team all-around event at the 1928 Summer Olympics.

References

1908 births
1996 deaths
Hungarian female artistic gymnasts
Olympic gymnasts of Hungary
Gymnasts at the 1928 Summer Olympics
Gymnasts from Budapest